The 2009–10 NHL season was the 93rd season of operation (92nd season of play) of the National Hockey League (NHL). It ran from October 1, 2009—including four games in Europe on October 2 and 3—until April 11, 2010, with the 2010 Stanley Cup playoffs running to June 9, 2010. A mid-season break from February 15 to February 28 occurred to allow participation of NHL players in the 2010 Winter Olympics in Vancouver. Because of the Winter Olympics break, there was no NHL All-Star Game for 2010. The Stanley Cup Finals saw the Chicago Blackhawks defeat the Philadelphia Flyers in six games, for their first championship since the 1960–61 season.

League business

Salary cap
The salary cap was increased by a small amount for the 2009–10 season. It was set at $56.8 million, $100,000 higher than in the 2008–09 season. The salary floor was $40.8 million.

Entry Draft

The Entry Draft was held June 26–27, 2009 at the Bell Centre in Montreal, Quebec. The New York Islanders chose John Tavares with the first overall pick. Other notable picks were Matt Duchene, Victor Hedman, Evander Kane and Oliver Ekman-Larsson.

New uniforms
Several teams (Calgary, Minnesota, Nashville, Florida and Colorado) debuted new third uniforms this season, while Philadelphia and Edmonton made their third uniform their primary home jersey, and Chicago made the jersey they wore for the previous season's Winter Classic their new alternate. The New Jersey Devils announced plans to play one game (March 17 against the Pittsburgh Penguins, the first anniversary of Martin Brodeur's record breaking 552nd win) wearing their 1982–1992 uniforms, albeit transferred onto the league's current RBK Edge jersey template. In addition, NHL officials had new uniforms, which debuted at the 2009 All-Star Game.

Television dispute
Prior to the season, a contract dispute between Versus (the NHL cable carrier for the United States) and satellite television supplier DirecTV blacked out Versus for 14 million satellite subscribers. Versus was restored to DirecTV in March 2010. While negotiations were secret, it was reported by the media that the dispute was over the "slotting" of Versus with other channels. Versus was restored to DirecTV in the same tier of channels as the previous season. Versus President Jamie Davis confirmed that the dispute was necessary to get "the same level of distribution we had prior to be taken off the air".

Phoenix Coyotes bankruptcy and sale

The Phoenix Coyotes' holding company, Dewey Ranch Hockey LLC, filed for Chapter 11 bankruptcy. In a statement, Moyes announced that he had agreed in principle to sell the team to PSE Sports and Entertainment, headed by Research in Motion co-CEO Jim Balsillie, for $212.5 million. As part of the deal, Balsillie intended to move the Coyotes to Hamilton, Ontario. Although initial reports said that Balsillie was considering Kitchener as well, Hamilton already has an NHL-sized arena in place, Copps Coliseum, and Balsillie was already in talks with city officials to secure a lease for the arena. Hamilton had previously bid for an NHL team in the 1990s, losing out to Ottawa. Balsillie had previously made unsuccessful approaches to purchase the Pittsburgh Penguins and Nashville Predators, with the intent of relocating either team to Hamilton.

The NHL opposed the bankruptcy and the matter went to Phoenix bankruptcy court. Two other potential bidders for the team emerged, Jerry Reinsdorf, owner of the Chicago White Sox and Ice Edge Holdings. Bankruptcy hearings were held from May until September. Reinsdorf and Ice Edge did not bid for the team, and the NHL put in the only rival bid for the team at court.

In September, a Phoenix bankruptcy court rejected offers from the NHL and Jim Balsillie, ending Balsillie's plan to move the Coyotes to Hamilton. The NHL's offer was rejected because it left out creditors Jerry Moyes and Wayne Gretzky. On Balsillie's offer, Judge Redfield T. Baum refused to sanction the use of bankruptcy to force relocation of a franchise on a league. Gretzky, who was head coach of the team for the previous four seasons, stayed away from training camp and was replaced. The Coyotes played their first home game to a sell-out; however, attendance was lower at other games in the month of October. Later in the month, the NHL and Moyes came to a tentative agreement to transfer ownership of the Coyotes to the NHL.

In December, the NHL announced that Ice Edge Holdings, a partnership of Canadians and Phoenix-area businessmen, had signed a letter of intent with the NHL to purchase the Coyotes. Ice Edge, which plans to keep the team in Phoenix, plans to play five Coyotes home games in Saskatoon, Saskatchewan, each season as part of a five-year plan to return the Coyotes to profitability. Ice Edge would still have to negotiate a lease agreement with the City of Glendale, and have its ownership approved by the NHL Board of Governors.

On March 6, the NHL launched a lawsuit for $61 million against former Coyotes owner Jerry Moyes to recover $10 million in bankruptcy court costs, $20 million in losses for 2009–10 and $11.6 million owed to creditors. Three weeks later, the Coyotes clinched their first playoff berth since 2002.

On April 13, Glendale, Arizona City Council approved a lease and sale agreement with Jerry Reinsdorf to take over the Coyotes and their lease of the Jobing.com Arena. The Council rejected the Ice Edge group. The agreement created a special tax district surrounding the arena. Businesses in that district would pay $47 million annually to support the team. The agreement gave Reinsdorf the option to move the team after five years if revenues were not up to expectations. Former Coyotes CEO Jeff Shumway criticized the deal, saying that the team would not have gone bankrupt if the same deal had been available two years earlier. Reinsdorf's bid, which paid the NHL $65 million for the team, needed approval by the league board of governors.

Pre-season
The 2009–10 pre-season for most teams started on September 14, 2009.

2009 Kraft Hockeyville
Since 2006, Kraft Foods has sponsored a sweepstakes called Kraft Hockeyville, in which various small cities across Canada compete against each other with the hopes of winning the privilege of having an NHL pre-season game played in a local sports complex or arena, along with a hockey festival named the Stanley Cup Jamboree. The 2009 winner was the city of Terrace, British Columbia. The pre-season matchup was between the home town favorite Vancouver Canucks and the New York Islanders.

Victoria Cup

The Victoria Cup, which was held in Zürich, Switzerland, on September 29, 2009, just prior to the regular-season games, was contested between ZSC Zurich Lions and the NHL's Chicago Blackhawks. The game was won by Zurich 2–1.

Regular season

Four teams (Blackhawks, Blues, Panthers and Red Wings) began their season in the NHL Premiere series, each playing two regular-season games in Europe. The Red Wings played the Blues in Stockholm, Sweden, at Ericsson Globe while the Blackhawks and Panthers played in Helsinki, Finland, at Hartwall Areena on October 2 and October 3. This is the second-straight season that Sweden has hosted an NHL regular season game, and the third season of the Premiere series, in which NHL regular season games are held in Europe. Unlike in previous years, the European games are not the inaugural games, as the regular season began October 1 in North America.

The Avalanche, picked by many in the media to finish last in the Western Conference, instead roared to a 10–2–2 mark for the month of October to lead the Western Conference, partly on the strong play of Craig Anderson in net and rookies Ryan O'Reilly and Matt Duchene. The Coyotes, who were also not expected to make the playoffs, started strongly. The team had signed some veterans and demoted some young players to the minors. The Coyotes surprised the Stanley Cup champion Penguins 3–0 in Pittsburgh.

In the Eastern Conference, the Penguins had the best record after the first month. Teams playing at a higher level than predicted included the Sabres, which led the Northeast Division through most of October. On the other end of the scale, 2009 Conference finalist Hurricanes had a 2–8–3 record for October, the worst in franchise history.

Two streaks came to an end in November. The Devils won nine games in a row on the road to start the season, one short of the league record set in the 2006–07 season by the Sabres, before losing in Philadelphia to the Flyers. The Hurricanes lost a franchise-high 14 games in a row before defeating the Wild in a shootout on November 15. The streak included overtime and shootout losses.

The 2009 flu pandemic hit the Oilers hard with several players out for stretches in October. The Flames received their flu shots ahead of the general public, causing an Alberta health official to be fired. The Maple Leafs and the Canucks teams both had members of their staff "jump the queue" and receive flu shots ahead of the general public and were criticized in the media.

In December, Shane Doan of the Coyotes played his 1,000th game in a 2–1 shootout win over the Blue Jackets. On December 21, New Jersey Devils goaltender Martin Brodeur recorded his 104th shutout, breaking a record set by Terry Sawchuk during the 1969–70 NHL season.

Three head coaches lost their positions in mid-season. Despite being early favorites for the Stanley Cup, the Philadelphia Flyers were 13–11–1 and 10th in the Eastern Conference when John Stevens was fired on December 4, 2009. On January 2, 2010, the Blues fired Head Coach Andy Murray. In 2008–09, the Blues had made the playoffs but struggled during 2009–10. Davis Payne was named interim head coach. One month later, on February 3, 2010, the Blue Jackets, unhappy with their slide in the standings after a good start, fired defensive-minded Head Coach Ken Hitchcock. Although the slide had started months previous, team management had given time to Hitchcock to resolve the situation before firing him.

Player trades started in earnest a month before the March 3, 2010, trade deadline. On January 31, the Maple Leafs made two large trades, getting Dion Phaneuf from the Flames in a seven-player trade, and Jean-Sebastien Giguere from the Ducks for two players. The Flames were not done, trading Olli Jokinen to the Rangers the next day. After top scorer and pending free agent Ilya Kovalchuk turned down a $101 million contract offer from the Thrashers, he was traded to the Devils on February 4.

On February 5, Boston investment banker Jeff Vinik agreed to buy the Lightning from owners OK Hockey, headed by Oren Koules and Len Barrie. The sale price was not disclosed, although the media speculated it was much less than the US$206 million that OK Hockey paid. The purchase was contingent on the approval of the NHL Board of Governors.

On February 8, Canadiens' General Manager Bob Gainey announced his retirement as GM, staying on as advisor to the club. Assistant GM Pierre Gauthier became the interim GM. Gauthier and Coach Jacques Martin held the same positions with the Senators in the late 1990s.

From 3 pm EST on February 12 until 11:59 pm on Feb. 28, teams were not permitted to make any trades, since many NHL players were competing at the 2010 Winter Olympics. The March 3 trade deadline produced 31 trades involving 55 players, the largest number in NHL history. The most active team was the Coyotes, who were involved in seven deals. Unlike previous seasons, the Coyotes were in a playoff position at the trade deadline and were "buyers" of players rather than "sellers" (that is, they were looking to acquire key players to give the team a chance in the playoffs, rather than trading away players to other teams seeking playoff success). Only the Dallas Stars and Philadelphia Flyers did not make any trades between March 1 (after the Olympic roster freeze was lifted) and the trade deadline on March 3 at 3:00 pm EST. 

On April 8, 2010, the Pittsburgh Penguins defeated the New York Islanders 7-3 in the final regular season game at Mellon Arena. The Penguins would move to CONSOL Energy Center for the next season.

Final standings
GP = Games played, W = Wins, L = Losses, OTL = Overtime/shootout losses, GF = Goals for, GA = Goals against, Pts = Points

bold – Qualified for playoffs; y – Won division

Eastern Conference
p – Won Presidents' Trophy (and division)

Western Conference

Tiebreaking procedures

If two or more clubs are tied in points during the regular season, the ranking of the clubs is determined in the following order:

The fewer number of games played.
The greater number of games won.
The greater number of points earned in games between the tied clubs. If two clubs are tied, and have not played an equal number of home games against each other, points earned in the first game played in the city that had the extra game shall not be included. If more than two clubs are tied, the higher percentage of available points earned in games among those clubs, and not including any "odd" games, shall be used to determine the standing.
The greater differential between goals for and against for the entire regular season.

Special events
The Avalanche retired 19, the number of Joe Sakic, at their home opener on October 1. The Canadiens celebrated their centennial on December 4 and retired the number 3 for Emile Bouchard and number 16 for Elmer Lach (which was already previously retired for Henri Richard). The Phoenix Coyotes retired 27, the number of Teppo Numminen at their home game.

Winter Classic

On July 15, 2009, the NHL announced that the third installment of the Winter Classic would take place on January 1, 2010, at Fenway Park in Boston, with the Bruins hosting the Flyers. Because the NHL did not host an All-Star Game in the 2009–10 season due to the 2010 Olympics, this became the league's showcase event. The Bruins won the game 2–1 in overtime. Marco Sturm scored the game-winning overtime goal, after the Bruins were initially down 1–0 in regulation. After the game, the roster of the United States men's hockey team for the 2010 Winter Olympics was released, which included Bruins' goaltender Tim Thomas.

Olympics

The NHL did not hold an All-Star Game this season. Instead, many of the league's players participated in the 2010 Winter Olympics in Vancouver, British Columbia. The Olympic men's ice hockey tournament ran from February 16 to February 28, 2010. It was the first time since the NHL allowed its players to compete in the Olympics that the Winter Olympics were held in an NHL market, as well as the first to use an NHL-sized ice rink (as opposed to the bigger one normally used for international play). General Motors Place, the Canucks' home arena, was the primary ice hockey venue for the Olympics, and was formally called Canada Hockey Place. The temporary name change reflects the International Olympic Committee policy against selling or promoting naming rights for its competition venues. Another example of this policy is that the ice surface and dasher boards had their advertisements removed. The Canadian team won gold, the American team won silver, and the Finnish team won bronze. At the end of the tournament, United States goaltender Ryan Miller was named Tournament MVP.

In order to prepare General Motors Place for the Olympics, the Canucks were required to face the longest road trip in NHL history, playing 14 straight road games from January 27 to March 13, 2010

Attendance

Notes
 Totals do not include two regular-season opening games played in Europe. The Detroit Red Wings played the St. Louis Blues at the Ericsson Globe in Stockholm, Sweden, and the Chicago Blackhawks played the Florida Panthers at Hartwall Areena in Helsinki, Finland.
 The Pittsburgh Penguins began play in their new arena (Consol Energy Center) on Wednesday, September 22, 2010. With a larger capacity, more luxury seating, and better amenities than their former home Mellon Arena, the Penguins are expected to have a larger average and overall attendance record in the 2010–11 season.
 As of July 6, 2010, Vancouver's GM Place was renamed Rogers Arena.

Playoffs

Bracket

NHL awards

All-Star teams

Player statistics

Scoring leaders
The following players led the league in points at the conclusion of the regular season.

GP = Games played; G = Goals; A = Assists; Pts = Points; +/– = Plus/minus; PIM = Penalty minutes

Source: NHL

Leading goaltenders
The following goaltenders led the league in goals against average at the end of the regular season.

GP = Games played; Min = Minutes played; W = Wins; L = Losses; OT = Overtime/shootout losses; GA = Goals against; SO = Shutouts; SV% = Save percentage; GAA = Goals against average

Coaches

Eastern Conference
Atlanta Thrashers: John Anderson
Boston Bruins: Claude Julien
Buffalo Sabres: Lindy Ruff
Carolina Hurricanes: Paul Maurice
Florida Panthers: Peter DeBoer
Montreal Canadiens: Jacques Martin
New Jersey Devils: Jacques Lemaire
New York Islanders: Scott Gordon
New York Rangers: John Tortorella
Ottawa Senators: Cory Clouston
Philadelphia Flyers: John Stevens and Peter Laviolette
Pittsburgh Penguins: Dan Bylsma
Tampa Bay Lightning: Rick Tocchet
Toronto Maple Leafs: Ron Wilson
Washington Capitals: Bruce Boudreau

Western Conference
Anaheim Ducks: Randy Carlyle
Calgary Flames: Brent Sutter
Chicago Blackhawks: Joel Quenneville
Colorado Avalanche: Joe Sacco
Columbus Blue Jackets: Ken Hitchcock and Claude Noel
Dallas Stars: Marc Crawford
Detroit Red Wings: Mike Babcock
Edmonton Oilers: Pat Quinn
Los Angeles Kings: Terry Murray
Minnesota Wild: Todd Richards
Nashville Predators: Barry Trotz
Phoenix Coyotes: Dave Tippett
San Jose Sharks: Todd McLellan
St. Louis Blues: Andy Murray and Davis Payne 
Vancouver Canucks: Alain Vigneault

Milestones

First games
The following is a list of players of note who played their first NHL game in 2009–10, listed with their first team:

Last games

The following is a list of players of note who played their last NHL game in 2009–10, listed with their team:

Hat tricks

See also
 2009–10 NHL transactions
 2009–10 NHL suspensions and fines
 2009 NHL Entry Draft
 2009 in sports
 2010 in sports
 List of 2009–10 NHL Three Star Awards
 2009–10 NHL attendance statistics

References
 
Notes

External links

 NHL.com
 2009–10 NHL season at Hockey Reference
 2009–10 NHL season at ESPN
 Hockey Database

 
1
1